The Third Feijóo Government was the regional government of Galicia led by President Alberto Núñez Feijóo between 2016 and 2020. It was formed in November 2016 after the September regional election.

Government

References

2016 establishments in Galicia (Spain)
Cabinets established in 2016
Cabinets of Galicia